Đặng Hữu Phúc (born June 4, 1953) is a Vietnamese pianist and composer best known for his film scores. A graduate of the Hanoi Conservatory, he has penned over 60 works, primarily for film and theatre.

In 2001 he won the Vietnam National Film Award Best Music for The Season of Guavas. Then he subsequently won the Best Music prize in 2005 at the 8th Shanghai International Film Festival for his work on Hồ Quang Minh's film  Thời xa vắng ("A Far Time Past") based on the novel of the same name by Lê Lựu.

Đặng is best known as a composer of symphonies and orchestral music, combining this traditional European style of music with elements of traditional Vietnamese music, such as Nhạc dân tộc cải biên. He is also noted in Vietnam for his instrumental music such as piano sonatas.

Works

Vocal works
Đặng Hữu Phúc has written several works for choir and orchestra. His choral symphony to poems of Nguyễn Đình Thi (1973) was performed at the Hanoi Opera House when the composer was only 20 years old. In 2004 10 pieces for a cappella choir ("10 bài cho hợp xướng không nhạc đệm") premiered, again at the Hanoi Opera House.

Phúc is also known for classical songs. In 1974 he wrote Ba bức tranh ("Three Paintings") for soprano and 2 pianos, which was premiered at the Vietnam School of Music by soprano Ái Vân. In 2006 he published the fruit of 30 years work, 60 selected romances for voice and piano (“Tuyển chọn 60 bài Romances và Ca khúc cho giọng hát với Piano”) - the first major Lieder collection by a Vietnamese composer. Several of these songs have been widely performed and broadcast including "Cơn mưa sang đò" ("Rain upon the boat"), "Trăng chiều" ("Moonlit"), “Ru con mùa đông” ("Lullaby of winter"), “Tôi vẫn hát” ("I still sing"). 14 of the songs were submitted for and won the Vietnam composers' award.

Film music
 A woman pickpocket (Bỉ vỏ)
 A far time past (Thời xa vắng)
 The season of guavas (Mùa ổi)
 Người đàn bà nghịch cát 
 Tướng về hưu

Discography
 Đặng Hữu Phúc Phác Thảo Mùa Thu (Vol 1.) CD

References

External links

 "Cultural events to celebrate national day", Vietnam+, 27/08/2009
 "Orchestra hits half-century mark", VietNamNet Bridge, 20/05/2009

1953 births
Living people
Vietnamese composers
Vietnamese film score composers
Vietnamese pianists
Vietnamese animators
21st-century pianists
20th-century pianists
21st-century composers
20th-century composers
Male pianists
Male composers
Male film score composers
20th-century male musicians
21st-century male musicians